Sappanone A is a homoisoflavanone that can be found in Caesalpinia sappan.

References 

Homoisoflavonoids